Zheng Silin (May 1940 – 9 May 2022) was a Chinese politician. A member of the Chinese Communist Party, he served as Minister of Labor and Social Security from 2003 to 2005. He died on 9 May 2022.

References

1940 births
2022 deaths
21st-century Chinese politicians
Chinese Communist Party politicians
Taiyuan University of Technology alumni
People from Suzhou
Government ministers of the People's Republic of China